Sonija Kwok Sin-nei (born 22 July 1974) is a Hong Kong actress who worked with TVB from 1999 to 2015. Since 2015, she has been managed by GAIA Entertainment.

Early life 
Kwok was born in Hong Kong and is of mixed three quarters Cantonese and one quarter English parentage. Kwok immigrated to Vancouver, British Columbia, Canada from Hong Kong. She initially attended the University of British Columbia, but transferred to Simon Fraser University where she completed her BA major in Psychology. After obtaining her degree, Kwok joined Cathay Pacific as a flight attendant.

Career 
After a short stint as a flight attendant, Kwok returned to Hong Kong in 1999 and competed in the 1999 Miss Hong Kong pageant. During the semi-final, she won the Miss Photogenic award making her a favourite to win Miss Hong Kong following the precedent since 1996. She subsequently won the title "Miss Hong Kong" in July 1999 as well as Miss International Goodwill and Miss Intelligence. Coincidentally, all the winners of the Miss Hong Kong pageant spanning 1997 to 2000 are from Vancouver, British Columbia, Canada.

After winning the "Miss Hong Kong" title, Kwok participated in numerous TVB events. In February 2000, she represented Hong Kong at the 2000 Miss Chinese International pageant in Las Vegas, Nevada.  She was crowned as the winner and also won two other awards. She is considered one of the most successful winners, as she, Michelle Reis, Hera Chan, and Grace Chan are the only three Miss Hong Kong pageant winners to have held both titles. Reis was the winner for the pageant's inaugural year in 1988, while Chan won in 2014. After her success in both pageants, she represented Hong Kong at the Miss Universe 2000 pageant held in Cyprus. Although she did not feature in the top ten list, she was included in the top ten list of "Miss Photogenic" featured on the Miss Universe's website main page. She is the last representative from Hong Kong to participate in Miss Universe contest.

She has appeared in many TVB television series and has starred in other TV shows, series, commercials, and entertainment functions, as well as being a spokeswoman for many beauty and other commercial products in Hong Kong. She has also appeared in television series which are produced in mainland China.

Personal life
Kwok married Chinese martial arts choreographer Zhu Shaojie (朱少杰) in Guam in 2011. The pair met in a film shooting in China a year earlier.

Kwok was previously romantically linked to TVB stars Deric Wan and Steven Ma.

Maid assault
On 24 March 2009, Kwok was attacked by her maid, who bit her arm, pulled her hair and held a knife to her neck. This followed Kwok's reporting to the police of an earlier incident in which the maid, apparently distraught over the break-up of a relationship, held a knife to her own throat and was calmed by Kwok. The helper was subsequently held in a mental hospital.

Awards 
Miss Hong Kong 1999 Miss Photogenic, Miss Intelligence, Miss International Goodwill, Winner.
Miss Chinese International 2000 Winner, Miss Internet Popularity, and Miss Vegas Gorgeous.
Starhub TVB Awards 2010 My Favourite TVB Female Character 2009: Ying Jing-Jing 邢晶晶 (D.I.E. Again)

Filmography

Television series

Film

References

External links
 
 
 

1974 births
21st-century Hong Kong actresses
Actresses from Vancouver
Canadian actresses of Hong Kong descent
Canadian film actresses
Canadian people of English descent
Canadian television actresses
Cathay Pacific
Flight attendants
Hong Kong emigrants to Canada
Hong Kong film actresses
Hong Kong people of English descent
Hong Kong television actresses
Living people
Miss Chinese International winners
Miss Hong Kong winners
Miss Universe 2000 contestants
Naturalized citizens of Canada
Simon Fraser University alumni